Haytham Farouk Abouelw (born 4 January 1971) is an Egyptian former professional footballer who played as a defender.

Farouk was born in Alexandria. He spent most of his career in Egypt and played for El-Olympi and Zamalek SC. He played for the Zamalek side that won the 2000 African Cup Winners' Cup. He also had a spell in Europe, playing for Dutch Eredivisie side Feyenoord, Swedish Allsvenskan side Helsingborgs IF and Belgian First Division side K.V. Oostende.

Farouk made several appearances for the Egypt national football team, including 1998 FIFA World Cup qualifying matches. He also played for Egypt at the 1992 Summer Olympics in Barcelona.

References

External links

Feyenoord Wie is Wie 

1971 births
Living people
Sportspeople from Alexandria
Association football defenders
Egyptian footballers
Egypt international footballers
Olympic footballers of Egypt
Footballers at the 1992 Summer Olympics
Egyptian Premier League players
Eredivisie players
Allsvenskan players
Olympic Club (Egypt) players
Feyenoord players
Helsingborgs IF players
K.V. Oostende players
Zamalek SC players
Ismaily SC players
Tersana SC players
Al Masry SC players
20th-century Egyptian people
21st-century Egyptian people